Dehdez District is a district (bakhsh) in Izeh County, Khuzestan Province, Iran. At the 2006 census, its population was 23,745, in 4,337 families.  The district has one city: Dehdez.  The district has three rural districts (dehestan): Dehdez Rural District, Donbaleh Rud-e Jonubi Rural District, and Donbaleh Rud-e Shomali Rural District.

References 

Izeh County
Districts of Khuzestan Province